

Map 

The map data is for the year 2017 from the World Bank. Numbers are as a percentage, and are based on the proportion of women who hold national seats.

Table 

The table data is for an interval of years from the World Bank. Numbers are as a percentage, and are based on the proportion of women who hold national seats.

See also

Plotted maps
European countries by electricity consumption per person
European countries by employment in agriculture (% of employed)
European countries by fossil fuel use (% of total energy)
European countries by health expense per person
European countries by military expenditure as a percentage of government expenditure
European countries by percent of population aged 0-14
European countries by percentage of urban population
List of sovereign states in Europe by life expectancy
List of sovereign states in Europe by number of Internet users

References

External links 

women in national parliaments
Women in Europe
E